The 1992–93 Macedonian Football Cup was the first and inaugural season of Macedonia's football knockout competition, since the Macedonia independence from Yugoslavia. The 1992–93 champions were FK Vardar who won their first title.

Semi-finals

|}
Source:

Final

See also
1992–93 Macedonian First Football League
1992–93 Macedonian Second Football League

References

External links
 1992–93 Macedonian Football Cup at rsssf.org

Macedonia
Cup
Macedonian Football Cup seasons